Eldorado is an unincorporated community in Fayette County, Iowa, United States. It is located at the junction of Iowa State Highway 150 and Major Road, six miles northeast of West Union.

History
 Eldorado is the eastern part of Auburn Township. Eldorado's population was 179 in 1902, and 165 in 1925.

References

Unincorporated communities in Fayette County, Iowa
Unincorporated communities in Iowa